Richard Albert Mohler Jr. (born October 19, 1959) is an American evangelical theologian, the ninth president of The Southern Baptist Theological Seminary in Louisville, Kentucky, and host of the podcast The Briefing, where he daily analyzes the news and recent events from an evangelical perspective. He has been described as "one of America's most influential evangelicals".

Education and personal life
Mohler was born on October 19, 1959, in Lakeland, Florida. During his Lakeland years, he attended Southside Baptist Church. Mohler attended college at Florida Atlantic University in Boca Raton in Palm Beach County as a Faculty Scholar. He then received a Bachelor of Arts from Samford University, a private, coeducational Baptist-affiliated college in Birmingham, Alabama. His Master of Divinity and Doctor of Philosophy degrees in systematic and historical theology were conferred by the Southern Baptist Theological Seminary.

Career
In addition to his presidency at SBTS, Mohler was the host of The Albert Mohler Program, a nationwide radio show "devoted to engaging contemporary culture with Christian beliefs." He currently produces a weekday podcast on the news, The Briefing, in which he provides commentary on current events from a Christian point of view, often providing a historical background as well.  He also regularly broadcasts interviews with various different people on a podcast called Thinking in Public. He is former vice chairman of the board of Focus on the Family and a member of the Council on Biblical Manhood and Womanhood. Christianity Today recognized Mohler as a leader among American evangelicals, and in 2003 Time called him the "reigning intellectual of the evangelical movement in the U.S." Mohler has presented lectures or addresses at a variety of conservative evangelical universities.

Mohler served as editor of The Christian Index, the biweekly newsletter of the Georgia Baptist Convention. From 1985 to 1993 he was Associate Editor of the bi-monthly Preaching Magazine. Mohler also served on the Advisory Council for the 2001 English Standard Version (ESV) of the Bible. Mohler previously blogged on Crosswalk.com, a web site maintained by Salem Web Network of Richmond, Virginia. Mohler currently blogs on his website, where his podcasts can also be listened to for free.

In 2018, Mohler labeled turmoil in the Southern Baptist Convention as the SBC's "own horrifying #MeToo moment" and said it stemmed from "an unorganized conspiracy of silence" about sexual misconduct and abuse. He wrote that the SBC's "issues are far deeper and wider" than the controversy surrounding Paige Patterson, who'd been moved that day from president to president emeritus of Southwestern Baptist Theological Seminary.

In early 2019, explosive newspaper reports of sexual abuse by church leaders and volunteers shook the Southern Baptist Convention, and Mohler called for independent third-party investigations. Just days after the Houston Chronicle's 2019 report of allegations of hundreds of sexual abuse cases (some of which were not reported to law enforcement), Mohler apologized in an interview with the newspaper for supporting a religious leader who was accused of helping conceal sexual abuses at his former church. Some have lauded Mohler, while others have questioned the timing and motivations of these comments. One day after Mohler's remarks to the Houston Chronicle, his Southern Baptist Theological Seminary office released a related statement by him.

Southern Baptist Theological Seminary

Mohler joined the staff of the Southern Baptist Theological Seminary in Louisville, Kentucky, in 1983 as Coordinator of Foundation Support. In 1987, he became Director of Capital Funding, a post he held until 1989. From 1983 to 1989, while still a student, he had served as assistant to then-President Roy Honeycutt. In February 1993, Mohler was appointed the ninth President of the seminary by the institution's board of trustees to succeed Honeycutt.

Theology and other faiths
In 2008, Al Mohler declined to sign An Evangelical Manifesto, publishing a lengthy explanation for his decision. Mohler is an Evangelical and an exclusivist, which means that he believes Jesus is the only way through which an individual can attain salvation or have a relationship with God the Father. As a Calvinist, Mohler believes that human salvation is a free gift from God which cannot be earned by human action or will and is only given to the elect. He has publicly advanced this position with respect to Judaism, Islam, and Catholicism. He recently stated that "any belief system, any world view, whether it's Zen Buddhism or Hinduism or dialectical materialism for that matter, Marxism, that keeps persons captive and keeps them from coming to faith in the Lord Jesus Christ, yes, is a demonstration of Satanic power." He believes Muslims are motivated by demonic power and in the months after the September 11, 2001 attacks, Mohler characterized Islamic views of Jesus as false and destructive:

Media appearances
Mohler appeared on MSNBC's Donahue on August 20, 2002. The subject was Christian evangelization of Jews. Mohler and Michael L. Brown, a Messianic Jew, debated this subject as well as Mohler's insistence that salvation lies exclusively in the personal acceptance of Christ before the afterlife with Donahue, a Catholic, and Rabbi Shmuley Boteach, an Orthodox Jew.

On April 15, 2003, Mohler was interviewed by Time on the subject of evangelizing Iraqi Muslims in the form of Christian aid groups.

On May 5, 2003, Mohler appeared on NPR's Fresh Air with Terry Gross to discuss the issue of evangelization of the Iraqis. At issue was whether the coupling of evangelizing with basic human aid relief might be perceived as aggressive or coercive by the Iraqi people, and whether such a perception, if widespread, might place other relief workers in jeopardy. Mohler argued that biblical, evangelical Christianity is not uniquely American, but exists as a movement throughout the world, so that Christian witnessing is not, in his view, to be interpreted as a move on the part of any single nation against the religion of another. At the same time, however, Mohler acknowledged the need for "sensitivity," and distanced himself from the idea that religion coerced. When pressed, Mohler expressed support for the idea of religious freedom as a theoretical matter of law.

On December 18, 2004, Mohler debated retired Episcopal bishop John Shelby Spong on Faith Under Fire, a program hosted by Lee Strobel and appearing on PAX, a Christian television network. The subject was the historicity and truthfulness of the Bible.

On December 19, 2013, Mohler appeared on CNN to discuss the controversy surrounding comments made by Phil Robertson of Duck Dynasty. GLAAD National Spokesman Wilson Cruz was also on the program.

Speaking engagements
On November 8–9, 2004, Mohler spoke at the annual meeting of the Florida Baptist State Convention.

On May 21, 2005, Mohler gave the commencement address at Union University in Jackson, Tennessee. Mohler told graduates they could display the glory of God by telling and defending the truth, sharing the gospel, engaging the culture, changing the world, loving the church and showing the glory of God in their own lives.

On February 25, 2014, Mohler delivered a Forum Lecture in the Marriott Center Arena at Brigham Young University in Provo, Utah. The title of Mohler's lecture was, "Strengthen the Things that Remain: Human Dignity, Human Rights, and Human Flourishing in a Dangerous Age."

Justice Sunday
Mohler was on the board of directors of Focus on the Family. In this role he was one of the principal organizers of Justice Sunday, a nationally televised event broadcast from Highview Baptist Church, in Louisville on April 24, 2005. Mohler shared the stage with Charles Colson and Focus on the Family founder James Dobson. US Senate Majority Leader Bill Frist appeared at the event via videotape. Another host of the program was Family Research Council president Tony Perkins.

The purpose of the broadcast was to mobilize the conservative base in lobbying the United States Senate to curtail debate on the nominations to the federal judiciary made by George W. Bush.

Theological views

On Catholicism 
Mohler believes the Catholic Church is a "false church" that teaches a "false gospel" and regards the Papacy as an illegitimate office. During a March 13, 2014 podcast of The Briefing, Mohler stated that Evangelicals "simply cannot accept the legitimacy of the papacy" and that "to do otherwise would be to compromise Biblical truth and reverse the Reformation." Mohler has denounced Pope Francis for his perceived left-leaning leadership.

Mohler stated that he was one of the original signatories to the Manhattan Declaration because it is a limited ecumenical statement of Christian conviction on the topics of abortion, euthanasia and gay marriage, and not a wide-ranging theological document that subverts confessional integrity. He emphasized that he signed the document in spite of his deep theological disagreements with the Catholic Church.

Family Planning 
Mohler spoke in June 2004, about married adults who choose not to have children.

Mohler has also been critical of birth control methods that prevent implantation of the fertilized egg, which he believes "involve nothing less than an early abortion." He has attempted to bring about a new reflection on the topic within evangelical opinion.

Gender roles and sexuality
In 2017, Mohler signed the Nashville Statement. He opposed the repeal of the US military's "don't ask, don't tell" policy on the grounds of religious liberty. He said of trans people "We cannot affirm someone in a delusion" when asked whether Christians should use a person's preferred name.

Science
Mohler is a young earth creationist.

Yoga
According to Mohler, yoga practice is not consistent with Christianity.

After voicing his stance on the topic, Mohler stated that he was 'surprised by the depth of the commitment to yoga found on the part of many who identify as Christians'.

Libertarianism
Mohler has argued that libertarianism is idolatrous, and as a comprehensive world view or fundamental guiding principle for human life, is inconsistent with Christian ideals. He is a proponent of personal liberty, but believes such liberties can run into problems when applied in the political sphere. The more limited economic libertarianism, on the other hand, can be consistent with the "comprehensive world view that Christianity puts forward."

Selected bibliography

Books authored by R. Albert Mohler Jr.
Atheism Remix: A Christian Confronts the New Atheists 
Culture Shift: Engaging Current Issues with Timeless Truth (Today's Critical Concerns) 
He Is Not Silent: Preaching in a Postmodern World  (September 1, 2008)
Desire and Deceit: The Real Cost of the New Sexual Tolerance  (September 16, 2008)
The Conviction to Lead: The 25 Principles for Leadership That Matters, expresses the view that leadership stems from conviction and moral character (2012).
We Cannot Be Silent: Speaking Truth to a Culture Redefining Sex, Marriage, and the Very Meaning of Right and Wrong  (October 27, 2015)
Acts 1-12 For You, first in a two-part popular-level commentary on the book of Acts  (The Good Book Company, 2018)
 The Apostles' Creed: Discovering Authentic Christianity in an Age of Counterfeits, (Thomas Nelson, 2019)
The Gathering Storm: Secularism, Culture, and the Church  (Thomas Nelson, 2020))
The Disappearance of God: Dangerous Beliefs in the New Spiritual Openness  Multnomah (May 5, 2009)

Books edited by R. Albert Mohler Jr.
 .
Theological Education in the Evangelical Tradition (Editor, with D. G. Hart)

Books to which R. Albert Mohler Jr. has contributed
Feed My Sheep: A Passionate Plea for Preaching 
The Coming Evangelical Crisis: Current Challenges to the Authority of Scripture and the Gospel by R. Kent Hughes (Editor), John MacArthur Jr. (Editor), R. C. Sproul (Editor), Michael S. Horton (Editor), Albert Mohler Jr. (Editor), John H. Armstrong (Editor) (Moody, 1996) 
The Compromised Church John H. Armstrong (Editor) (Crossway Books, 1998) 
Why I Am a Baptist Tom J. Nettles and Russell D. Moore Eds. Chapter 6 (p. 58), entitled "Being Baptist Means Conviction" (Broadman & Holman, 2001) 
A Theology For The church Daniel L. Akin (Editor). Conclusion (p. 927) entitled "The Pastor as Theologian" (Broadman & Holman, 2007) 
Five Views on Biblical Inerrancy by J. Merrick and Stephen M. Garrett, eds. (Zondervan, 2013)

See also 

 Religion and spirituality podcast

References

Further reading
"Modeling Modesty" by Mary Mohler
"Transforming Culture: Christian Truth Confronts Post-Christian America"
"Ministry is Stranger Than it Used to Be: The Challenge of Postmodernism"
"The Urgency of Preaching"
"Biblical Pattern of Male Leadership Limits Pastorate to Men"
"Does God Give Bad Advice? The 'Open' View of God Stakes its Ground"
"Keeping The Faith In a Faithless Age: The Church As The Moral Minority"
"The Compassion of Truth: Homosexuality in Biblical Perspective"
"The Scandal of the Empty Tomb: The Glory of the Resurrection"
"Consider Your Calling: The Call to the Ministry"

"The Seduction of Pornography and the Integrity of Christian Marriage" PDF and MP3.
Address on "Justice Sunday" in MP3
Russell D. Moore, Senior Vice President of Academic Administration, and Dean of the School of Theology at Southern Seminary, presented an article at ETS entitled "After Patriarchy, What? Why Egalitarians Are Winning the Evangelical Gender Debate"

External links
 Albert Mohler Official Website.
 Albert Mohler on Twitter.

1959 births
American Calvinist and Reformed theologians
American critics of Islam
American Baptist theologians
Baptist writers
American Christian Young Earth creationists
Living people
People from Lakeland, Florida
Writers from Louisville, Kentucky
Florida Atlantic University alumni
Samford University alumni
Southern Baptist ministers
Southern Baptist Theological Seminary alumni
Southern Baptist Theological Seminary presidents
20th-century Calvinist and Reformed theologians
21st-century Calvinist and Reformed theologians
Christian critics of Islam
Critics of the Catholic Church
Christian bloggers
Baptists from Kentucky
American Calvinist and Reformed Christians